Rabbi Goodman Lipkind (1878 – 1973) was a London rabbi who later emigrated to New York City. He wrote several articles for the Jewish Encyclopedia in 1906. He is today mainly remembered for having been the factual base for the picture of Joseph Strelitski, the rabbi who emigrated to America in Israel Zangwill's Children of the Ghetto.

Biography
Lipkind was born on 27 June 1878 in Whitechapel, London. His parents were John and Rebecca Lipkind.

On 13 June 1911 the Milwaukee Journal reported that United Hebrew Congregation, "the largest Hebrew congregation in the United States", in St Louis, had elected Lipkind, who was then at the Sinai congregation in Milwaukee, to succeed Henry Messing as its new Rabbi. Lipkind served at UHC from 1912 to 1914.

On 15 October 1915 the New York Times reported his marriage to Charlotte G Harris in Eighty-Sixth Street Temple where he was Rabbi.

He was rabbi of the Gates of Heaven temple in Schenectady, New York until 1926.

He died on 1 May 1973 at Long Beach, Nassau County, New York.

References

External links
Congregation Gates of Heaven, Schenectady, New York  
The Jewish Encyclopedia, 1906 

1878 births
1973 deaths
British emigrants to the United States
British Reform rabbis
Clergy from London
Contributors to the Jewish Encyclopedia
People from Schenectady, New York